Oscar Eliseo Medelius Rodríguez (born 3 September 1955) is a Peruvian Fujimorist politician. He is a former member of the Congress of the Republic of Peru. An attorney by trade, Medelius was elected to Peruvian Congress on the Fujimorist Cambio 90-New Majority ticket.

Medelius was allegedly involved in a scandal in which the National Intelligence Service forged signatures to get the Peru 2000 political party on the ballot. On February 7, 2006 Medelius was arrested in the United States.  In 2001, violating the Peruvian Constitution, the Peruvian Criminal Procedure Code, treaties and human rights covenant, the Peruvian authorities reopened a criminal docket closed definitely since October 2000. Oscar Medelius fled Peru to seek humanitarian protection in the United States. On April 10, 2008, the Attorney General of Peru announced that United States Secretary of State Condoleezza Rice authorized Medelius's extradition to Peru. On April 18, 2008 he arrived in Lima. On June 16, 2009, Medelius was declared innocent and consequently removed from the process after the Supreme Court accepted the former Congressman's appeal submitted in November 2008. Medelius had recurred to such notice of appeal in response to a previous ruling which sentenced him to 8 years in prison. After analyzing the corresponding evidence and basing the final verdict on other rulings pertaining to the case, the Supreme Court ordained Medelius' exclusion from the case in an official ruling released on June 16, 2009.

References 

Living people
Fujimorista politicians
Members of the Congress of the Republic of Peru

1955 births